Francine "Penny" Patterson (born February 13, 1947) is an American animal psychologist. She is best known for teaching a modified form of American Sign Language, which she calls "Gorilla Sign Language", or GSL, to a gorilla named Koko beginning in 1972, although the scientific validity of Patterson's claims as to the extent of Koko's language mastery has been debated.

Early life and education
Patterson is the second oldest of seven children and daughter of C. H. Patterson, a professor of psychology, and Frances Spano Patterson. She was born in Chicago and moved with her family to Edina, Minnesota, when she was young, and then to Urbana, Illinois. Her mother died of cancer when Patterson was a freshman in college and the youngest of her siblings was just five years old. This triggered her interest in developmental psychology, a theme which pervaded much of her later work.

Patterson earned her bachelor's degree in psychology at the University of Illinois at Urbana-Champaign in 1970. She attained her Ph.D. in 1979 from Stanford University, with her dissertation Linguistic Capabilities of a Lowland Gorilla, on teaching sign language to Koko and Michael, another Western lowland gorilla, who died in 2000.

Career

Currently, Patterson serves as the President and Research Director of The Gorilla Foundation. The foundation was founded with her longtime research colleague Ronald Cohn in 1978 using monetary support from a Rolex Award. The Gorilla Foundation had been trying to move from its current home in Woodside, California, to Maui, Hawaii.

Patterson is also an author of nonfiction works, including The Education of Koko, Koko's Kitten, Koko-Love!: Conversations With a Signing Gorilla, and Koko's Story. All of these books deal with her personal experiences with signing gorillas.

Patterson and her work with Koko are the subject of Barbet Schroeder's 1978 feature-length documentary Koko: A Talking Gorilla.

Patterson is an adjunct professor of psychology at Santa Clara University and a member of the Board of Consultants at the Center for Cross Cultural Communication in Washington, D.C. She is the Editor-in-Chief of the Gorilla journal.

References

External links 
 The Gorilla Foundation
 Koko: A Talking Gorilla at Criterion Collection
 
 

21st-century American psychologists
American women psychologists
Animal trainers
Stanford University alumni
University of Illinois Urbana-Champaign alumni
Santa Clara University faculty
People from Chicago
1947 births
Living people
Scientists from the San Francisco Bay Area
American women academics
21st-century American women
University Laboratory High School (Urbana, Illinois) alumni
20th-century American psychologists